''Boswellia'' sp. A is an undescribed species of plant in the family Burseraceae. It is endemic to Yemen. Its natural habitats are subtropical or tropical dry forests and rocky areas.

References

sp. A
Endemic flora of Socotra
Threatened flora of Asia
Vulnerable plants
Undescribed plant species
Taxonomy articles created by Polbot